In mathematics, the elasticity or point elasticity of a positive differentiable function f of a positive variable (positive input, positive output) at point a is defined as

or equivalently

It is thus the ratio of the relative (percentage) change in the function's output  with respect to the relative change in its input , for infinitesimal changes from a point . Equivalently, it is the ratio of the infinitesimal change of the logarithm of a function with respect to the infinitesimal change of the logarithm of the argument. Generalisations to multi-input-multi-output cases also exist in the literature.

The elasticity of a function is a constant  if and only if the function has the form  for a constant .

The elasticity at a point is the limit of the arc elasticity between two points as the separation between those two points approaches zero.

The concept of elasticity is widely used in economics and Metabolic Control Analysis; see elasticity (economics) and Elasticity coefficient respectively for details.

Rules
Rules for finding the elasticity of products and quotients are simpler than those for derivatives.  Let f, g be differentiable.  Then

The derivative can be expressed in terms of elasticity as

Let a and b be constants.  Then

,
.

Estimating point elasticities

In economics, the price elasticity of demand refers to the elasticity of a demand function Q(P), and can be expressed as (dQ/dP)/(Q(P)/P) or the ratio of the value of the marginal function (dQ/dP) to the value of the average function (Q(P)/P). This relationship provides an easy way of determining whether  a demand curve is elastic or inelastic at a particular point. First, suppose one follows the usual convention in mathematics of plotting the independent variable (P) horizontally and the dependent variable (Q) vertically. Then the slope of a line tangent to the curve at that point is the value of the marginal function at that point. The slope of a ray drawn from the origin through the point is the value of the average function. If the absolute value of the slope of the tangent is greater than the slope of the ray then the function is elastic at the point; if the slope of the secant is greater than the absolute value of the slope of the tangent then the curve is inelastic at the point. If the tangent line is extended to the horizontal axis the problem is simply a matter of comparing angles created by the lines and the horizontal axis. If the marginal angle is greater than the average angle then the function is elastic at the point; if the marginal angle is less than the average angle then the function is inelastic at that point. If, however, one follows the convention adopted by economists and plots the independent variable P on the vertical axis and the dependent variable Q on the horizontal axis, then the  opposite rules would apply.

The same graphical procedure can also be applied to a supply function or other functions.

Semi-elasticity
A semi-elasticity (or semielasticity) gives the percentage change in f(x) in terms of a change (not percentage-wise) in x. Algebraically, the semi-elasticity S of a function f at point x is 

The semi-elasticity will be constant for exponential functions of the form,  since,

An example of semi-elasticity is modified duration in bond trading.

The term "semi-elasticity" is also sometimes used for the change if f(x) in terms of a percentage change in x which would be

See also
 Arc elasticity
 Elasticity (economics)
 Elasticity coefficient (biochemistry)
 Homogeneous function
 Logarithmic derivative

References

Further reading

Functions and mappings
Mathematical economics